Warszawa Aleje Jerozolimskie railway station is a railway station in the Ochota district of Warsaw, Poland. The station is built on a viaduct of Aleje Jerozolimskie. It handles trains from Warszawska Kolej Dojazdowa, from Warszawa Śródmieście WKD to Grodzisk Mazowiecki Radońska and Milanówek Grudów, and Koleje Mazowieckie, from Warszawa Wschodnia via  to Góra Kalwaria and Skarzysko Kamienna. The platforms for the Warszawska Kolej Dojazdowa were built in 1974 as part of the realignment of the route into central Warsaw. The platforms for Koleje Mazowieckie trains were added in 2008.

References
Station article at kolej.one.pl
WKD station article at kolej.one.pl

External links

Railway stations in Poland opened in 1974
Aleje Jerozolimskie
Railway stations served by Warszawska Kolej Dojazdowa
Railway stations served by Koleje Mazowieckie
Ochota